Kipchirchir is a name used among the Kalenjin people that means the bearer is a man  and was "born after a short labour" as the term "Chirchir" implies haste. Its feminine equivalent is Chepchirchir.

Notable People

Athletes
Alex Kipchirchir  (born 1984), Kenyan middle-distance runner and 2006 Commonwealth Games champion
Emmanuel Kipchirchir Mutai (born 1984), Kenyan marathon runner and 2011 London Marathon winner
Daniel Kipchirchir Komen (born 1984), Kenyan middle-distance runner and two-time world indoor runner-up
Abraham Kipchirchir Rotich (born 1993), Kenyan 800 metres runner
Bernard Kipchirchir Lagat (born 1974), Kenyan middle- and long-distance runner and two-time world champion competing for the United States

Politicians
William Kipchirchir Samoei arap Ruto (born 1966), President of Kenya

See also
Chirchir (disambiguation), origin of the name Kipchirchir

References

Kalenjin names